National Civic Union (in Spanish: Unión Cívica Nacional) was a political party in Peru. The party was founded around 1939. Its general secretary was Luis Felipe Villarán Freire. The UCN, represented by Villarán Freire participated in the five-member commission set up by Manuel A. Odría ahead of the 1956 Peruvian general election.

References

Defunct political parties in Peru
Political parties with year of disestablishment missing
Political parties with year of establishment missing